Gandhigram may refer to:
Gandhigram, Arunachal Pradesh, a town in Arunachal Pradesh, India
Gandhigram railway station, Ahmedabad, Gujarat, India
Gandhigram, Tamil Nadu, a village in Tamil Nadu, India
Gandhigram, Tripura, a town in Tripura, India
Gandhigram, Visakhapatnam, a neighbourhood in Visakhapatnam, Andhra Pradesh, India